South Pittsburg High School is a high school in South Pittsburg, Tennessee, United States. It is part of Marion County Schools. The school was established in 1924.

References

External links

1924 establishments in Tennessee
Educational institutions established in 1924
Education in Marion County, Tennessee
Public high schools in Tennessee